The water polo event was contested at the 1959 Summer Universiade in Turin, Italy. Seven teams competed in the event with Yugoslavia winning the gold medal after winning all three of their matches in the final group.

Preliminary round

Group A

Group B

Note: Spain was also included in this group but had to withdraw from the competition.

References
 Universiade water polo medalists on HickokSports  (Archived)
 Results (todor66.com)

1959 Summer Universiade
Universiade
1959
1959